Banovina may refer to:

 Banovinas of the Kingdom of Yugoslavia from 1929 to 1941
 Banovina (region) in central Croatia, also known as Banija
 Radio Banovina, radio station in the city of Glina, Croatia
 Palace Banovina, governmental building complex in the city of Novi Sad, Serbia

See also
Banate (disambiguation)
Banat (disambiguation)